The 2020 Tata Open Maharashtra was a 2020 ATP Tour tennis tournament played on outdoor hard courts. It was the 25th edition of the only ATP tournament played in India and took place in Pune, India, from 3 February through 9 February 2020. Unseeded Jiří Veselý won the singles title.

Singles main-draw entrants

Seeds

1 Rankings as of 20 January 2020

Other entrants 
The following players received wildcards into the singles main draw:
  Arjun Kadhe 
  Sasikumar Mukund
  Ramkumar Ramanathan

The following player received entry using a protected ranking into the singles main draw:
  Cedrik-Marcel Stebe

The following players received entry from the qualifying draw:
  Roberto Marcora 
  Nikola Milojević 
  Lukáš Rosol 
  Viktor Troicki

Withdrawals 
Before the tournament
  Philipp Kohlschreiber → replaced by  Ilya Ivashka
  Kamil Majchrzak → replaced by  Prajnesh Gunneswaran

During the tournament
  Viktor Troicki

Doubles main-draw entrants

Seeds 

 1 Rankings are as of 20 January 2020.

Other entrants 
The following pairs received wildcards into the doubles main draw:
  Matthew Ebden /  Leander Paes
  Rohan Bopanna /  Arjun Kadhe

The following pair received entry as alternates:
  Egor Gerasimov /  Sumit Nagal

Withdrawal
Before the tournament
  Peter Gojowczyk (hip injury)

Champions

Singles 

  Jiří Veselý def.  Egor Gerasimov, 7–6(7–2), 5–7, 6–3

Doubles 

  André Göransson /  Christopher Rungkat def.  Jonathan Erlich /  Andrei Vasilevski, 6–2, 3–6, [10–8]

References

External links 
Official website